Sergey Yevgenyevich Korepanov (6 January 1948 – 28 June 2022) was a Russian politician. A member of United Russia, he served as chairman of the Tyumen Oblast Duma from 1998 to 2022.

Korepanov died in Tyumen on 28 June 2022 at the age of 74.

Legacy
On December 9, 2022, a monument to Sergey Korepanov was unveiled in Salekhard near the building of the legislative assembly of the district.

References

1948 births
2022 deaths
United Russia politicians
Communist Party of the Soviet Union members
Members of the Federation Council of Russia (1994–1996)
Members of the Federation Council of Russia (1996–2000)
Recipients of the Order of Honour (Russia)
Russian Academy of State Service alumni
People from Naryan-Mar